Erin Pac (born May 30, 1980) is a former American bobsledder who competed from 2002 to 2010. She won two medals in the mixed bobsled-skeleton team event at the FIBT World Championships with a silver in 2007 and a bronze in 2008.

A native of Farmington, Connecticut and now living in Milford, Connecticut, Pac earned a degree in rehabilitation and disabilities studies with a concentration in rehabilitation counseling from Springfield College in Massachusetts.

It was announced on 16 January 2010 that she made the US team for the 2010 Winter Olympics. Pac and brake-woman Elana Meyers won the bronze medal in the Two-Woman Bobsled Event on February 24, 2010. Their first run had a time of 53.28.  They ran 53.05 in the second run. Their third and fourth run timed in at 53.29 and 53.78 respectively for a total of 3:33.40, 1.12 off the gold medal pace.

In November 2010, she announced her retirement from competitive sports.

References

 16 January 2010 US Bobsled and Skeleton Federation announcement of the US Olympic women's bobsled team. - accessed 18 January 2010.
 
 Mixed bobsled-skeleton world championship medalists since 2007
 Official website
 US Bobsled and Skeleton Federation profile 

1980 births
Living people
People from Farmington, Connecticut
American female bobsledders
Bobsledders at the 2010 Winter Olympics
People from Milford, Connecticut
Springfield College (Massachusetts) alumni
Olympic bronze medalists for the United States in bobsleigh
Medalists at the 2010 Winter Olympics
21st-century American women